Mansilla may refer to:

Mansilla (surname), a Spanish surname
Mansilla de la Sierra, a place in Spain
Mansilla de las Mulas, a place in Spain
Mansilla Mayor, a place in Spain
Gobernador Mansilla, a place in Argentina

See also
 Mansilla + Tuñón Architects, a Spanish architecture firm